State Express 555, known as 555 and Bentoel 555, is a Westminster, London-based luxurious cigarette originally manufactured in the United Kingdom by the Ardath Tobacco Company. The overseas rights to the brand excluding the United Kingdom, were acquired by British American Tobacco (BAT) in 1925. 555 cigarettes was British commonwealth in the following countries: Antigua and Barbuda, Barbados, Canada, Grenada, United Kingdom, Malaysia, Sierra Leone, Ghana, Bangladesh, Uganda, Kenya, Mauritius, India, Singapore, Australia and New Zealand. In the United Kingdom, 555 cigarettes are registered and manufactured in Westminster, City of Westminster, London. This  brand was officially slogan, motto and tagline is Smoothness Above All Else.

History

Origins
The idea for the State Express brand came from the United States in 1893. Sir Albert Levy (1864–1937), a London tobacco merchant and businessman, was visiting the United States. While in Manhattan, Levy was a passenger on the Empire State Express train, which allegedly broke land speed records as locomotive No.999, the "Queen of Speed" sped its way from New York City to Buffalo, New York.

State Express was founded in London on 10 March 1896. The numerals (a series of triple numbers from 111 to 999) forming the other part of the trademark were registered under UK Registration No. 290529 on 18 February 1907. All of these numbers were used as different brands, each with a different blend or mix of tobacco: 444 was made with Macedonian leaf, and 777 was made with Turkish tobacco, for example. The numeric ranges for State Express cigarettes were not the only available variants in the market at that time. Other mark names included My Darling and Astorias, available in export catalogues. In addition to the cigarette business, cigars and tobaccos were available in the State Express range. But by far the most successful of these was the Virginia tobacco blend of State Express 555, introduced in 1896. It went on to become Ardath's flagship brand.

The brand was originally owned by Ardath Tobacco Company. The company was created in the late 19th century in London, England, and was originally called Albert Levy & Thomas.

The Ardath Tobacco Company Limited was originally located at 62 Leadenhall Street in London and called La Casa de Habana (The House of Havana) until 1895, when it changed its name to the present day version. It is said that Sir Albert Levy derived the name Ardath from a book of the same name written by Marie Corelli. The title of the book is derived from numerous references in the Books of Esdras (in the Apocrypha) to the "Field of Ardath". For example, in the fourth book, chapter IX, verse XXVI reads:

'So I went my way into the field which is called Ardath, like as He commanded me, and there I sat among the flowers and did eat of the herbs of the field and the meat of the same satisfied me'  On 31 July 1895 Levy registered the trademark Ardath in Ireland.

The name of the company was changed in 1901 to the "Ardath Tobacco Company", and was split in 1925 when it was sold; British American Tobacco acquired the overseas rights of Ardath, while the Imperial Tobacco Group retained the rights of sale within the United Kingdom and Ireland. The State Express brand proved to be a boon for B.A.T., where it was a huge success in China until the rise of communism there (though it has since been re-introduced). Ardath's brands continued to be sold in Britain; they were granted a Royal Warrant by King George VI in 1946 and again later by Queen Elizabeth II. 
In 1961, British American Tobacco bought out Imperial Tobacco's share of Ardath, thus gaining full control of Ardath's trademarks.

War times 
In World War II Ardath supplied 555 boxes of cigarettes to General Montgomery's 8th Army. Montgomery organised their distribution and sent a personal letter of appreciation to the manufacturer’s.

In the 1920s and 1930s BAT held a dominant position in the Chinese market with State Express 555 playing a key role. Sales of the brand exceeded 5 billion units in 1937. According to Mao Zedong's personal physician, 555 was the Chinese leader’s favorite cigarette. On the day of the Proclamation of the People's Republic of China, Mao Zedong and Liu Shaoqi reportedly smoked 555 cigarettes; Mao stated that "Chiang Kai-Shek, chief of military logistics" had procured the cigarettes for them, a joke about the rapid pace with which Nationalist troops surrendered during the Chinese Civil War, together with their Western-made arms and supplies.

Sport sponsorship

Rallying and Formula One

555 sponsors motorsports. 555 World Racing logos were seen on Hong Kong – Beijing Rally cars from 1985 to 1987 and Subaru World Rally Championship cars from 1993 to 2004. (the actual 555 brand placement became less frequent in the 21st century, being dropped in 2005). Subaru continued to use 555's blue and yellow colour scheme as its WRC livery until its withdrawal, but with the manufacturer's own logos in place of the 555 brand. The Subaru 22B has been speculated that its name came from 555 as 22B is its hexadecimal equivalent.  For rallies where tobacco advertising was forbidden, the 555 logos were replaced by three crescent moons.

British American Racing in 1999 originally wanted to brand Ricardo Zonta's car in the blue & yellow livery of 555 World Racing, whilst branding Jacques Villeneuve's car with Lucky Strike colours. However, the move was blocked by the FIA, and they were forced to run two similar liveries. They opted to have the Lucky Strike brand on the left of the car and 555 World Racing on the right, with a zip going along the middle of the nose. It was highly unpopular, and so for the 2000 season, they chose to just display mostly Lucky Strike logos, with small 555 World Racing logos on the side and nose. Some years between 2000 and 2006 (After Honda had bought out BAR, and were under pressure to drop tobacco sponsorship under new EU legislation), they prominently displayed the 555 World Racing brand at the Chinese Grands Prix, where the 555 brand is better known. However, from 2007 until their withdrawal at the end of 2008, Honda adopted a livery with no sponsorship logos at all, but a livery depicted Earth to raise environmental awareness. In countries where tobacco sponsoring was banned, the 555 logos were replaced by three crescent moons.

Other sponsorships
 In 1979 and 1982, 555 sponsored Badminton.
 In 1980, 555 sponsored 1980 Summer Olympics.
 The 1984 Challenge Cup was named the State Express Challenge Cup due to sponsorship from State Express.
 In 1992, 555 (with Bentoel Group and Rothmans Group) sponsored the 1992 World Rally Championship season.
 In 1996 Star Trek: The Next Generation on Myanmar TV was sponsored by 555.

Markets
State Express 555 is or was British commonwealth in the following countries: Antigua and Barbuda, Barbados, Canada, Grenada, United Kingdom, Malaysia, Sierra Leone, Ghana, Bangladesh, Uganda, Kenya, Mauritius, India, Singapore, Australia and New Zealand.

In popular culture
The brand is cited in Salman Rushdie's post-colonial novel Midnight's Children, where it is, mis-attributed to the former British importer and manufacturer W.D. & H.O. Wills: Rushdie later explains this as symptomatic of an 'unreliable narrative' device in his essay on the book's 'errata'.

The brand was President Sukarno of Indonesia choice of cigarette. Also called "Bentoel 555".

This is the brand was officially based such as:
Westminster, City of Westminster, London, UK
London Stock Exchange, City of London, London, UK

This is the brand was officially located such as:
Auckland CBD, Auckland, New Zealand
Wellington Central, Wellington, New Zealand
Kuala Lumpur City Centre, Kuala Lumpur, Federal Territories, Malaysia
Sydney central business district, Sydney, New South Wales, Australia
Downtown Core, Singapore
Central Region, Downtown Core, Singapore
Central Area, Downtown Core, Singapore
Marina Bay, Downtown Core, Singapore
Melbourne central business district, Melbourne, Victoria, Australia

This is the brand was officially slogan, motto and tagline is Smoothness Above All Else.

It was advertised on British radio as "State Express Three-Five". They never mentioned if this was a dimension or some other fact about the cigarette and never called it 5-5-5 in these advertisements.

Slogan/Motto/Tagline
Smoothness Above All Else

References

British American Tobacco brands
1896 introductions